Mount Barr is a mountain in the Skagit Range of the Cascade Mountains of southern British Columbia, Canada, located on the northeast side of Wahleach Lake and just southwest of Hope.

Mount Barr is one of several magmatic features just north of the Chilliwack batholith. It is part of a large circular igneous intrusion that was placed along the Fraser Fault 16 to 21 million years ago. The intrusion is part of the Pemberton Volcanic Belt, an eroded volcanic belt that formed as a result of subduction of the Farallon Plate starting 29 million years ago.

References

External links
 
 

Canadian Cascades
One-thousanders of British Columbia
Landforms of Lower Mainland
Pemberton Volcanic Belt
Stocks (geology)
Miocene magmatism
Yale Division Yale Land District